McVean is a surname. Notable people with the surname include:

Charles McVean (1802–1848), American judge
Gilean McVean, British statistician
Katie McVean (born 1986), New Zealand equestrian
Malcolm McVean (1871–1907), Scottish footballer

See also
David McVean House, a historic house in Monroe County, New York